OMV Petrom S.A. is a Romanian integrated oil company, controlled by Austria's OMV. It is one of the largest corporations in Romania and the largest oil and gas producer in Southeast Europe. Since 2004 it is a subsidiary of OMV.

History 
In late 2004, Petrom was privatized by the Romanian state and sold to Austrian oil company OMV, which acquired of the previous SNP Petrom SA. , it was the largest privatization deal in Romania's history.

Until 2005, Petrom owned six offshore drilling platforms, of which five, GSP Atlas, GSP Jupiter, GSP Orizont, GSP Prometeu and GSP Saturn were sold to Grup Servicii Petroliere for US$100 million.

In January 2006, Petrom purchased OMV's operations in Romania, Bulgaria and Serbia and Montenegro. As a result of the transaction, the gas station networks of OMV were transferred to Petrom, but continued to operate under the OMV brand.

From 1 January 2010, the company changed its name to OMV Petrom.

In April 2010, OMV Petrom expanded the portfolio of its projects, in terms of electricity production, through the acquisition of 100% of the SC Wind Power Park SRL, a developer of the Dorobanţu Wind Farm.

On May 18, 2010, OMV Petrom announced the conclusion of an offshore campaign in the Lebăda Est and Lebăda Vest fields, located at the Histria block in the Black Sea. Following this offshore campaign, additional production of more than 300,000 boe was expected in 2010, from two existing wells (LO2 and LO4) and a new well drilled (LV05).

On June 1, 2010, OMV Petrom announced the start-up of the Hurezani gas delivery system, a project intended to optimize gas delivery into the national transportation network in periods when pressure in the system was very high.

On July 12, 2010, OMV Petrom announced the signing of a 15-year production enhancement contract for several fields in the area of Țicleni, Southwest Romania, with Petrofac, a leading international provider of facilities solutions to the oil and gas production and processing industry. Petrofac will perform services in the respective fields in order to maximize production while improving operational efficiency. The partnership targets cumulative production enhancement out of nine onshore fields in the Țicleni area by at least 50% in the next five years.

On September 6, 2010, OMV Petrom announced the sale of the 74.9% stake in Ring Oil (Russia) to its minority partner Mineral and Bio Oil Fuels Limited (MBO).

From October 1, 2010, OMV Petrom has completed the consolidation of marketing activities in Romania in a single entity, OMV Petrom Marketing SRL.

On December 2, 2010, OMV Petrom inaugurated Petrom City, the headquarters that hosts the company's central operations. Situated in the northern part of Bucharest, it will be used by around 2,500 employees from 7 headquarters of the company in Bucharest and Ploiești. The employee relocation process started in the fourth quarter of 2010 and was estimated to be finalized in the first half of 2011.

In 2010, OMV Petrom inaugurated the Hurezani gas delivery system, designed to optimize gas supply to the national transport network. There was a new measurement system of the gas delivery point Hurezani, to adapt to changing parameters of the gas flow and pressure. The total investment budgeted amounted to about 135 million euros.

Operations
Apart from its operations in Romania, the company operates in Bulgaria, Serbia, Hungary, Moldova, Kazakhstan, Iran and Russia. In Moldova, OMV Petrom has operated 73 filling stations, being one of the leading oil companies, alongside Lukoil. In Hungary, there have been at least 2 OMV Petrom filling stations.

OMV Petrom has operated in several countries:
Romania - largest company;
Moldova - 2nd largest company, 31% market share;
Bulgaria - 3rd largest company, 18% market share;
Serbia and Montenegro - 3rd largest company, 13% market share.

Privatization controversy
The OMV Petrom privatization took place during the last months of the Adrian Năstase government. In December 2004, OMV obtained a 51% stake in SNP Petrom SA.

Major Romanian newspapers published articles criticising the privatization of Petrom, on the grounds that last-minute unadvertised moves gave Petrom all of Romania's oil and gas reserves just before the privatization contract was signed. It was claimed that this move gave away the control of the country's national resources

As a consequence, OMV Petrom has a de facto monopoly on the oil production of Romania. Moreover, the state did not impose price controlling clauses in the privatization contract, so that Romanian-produced petroleum is sold in Romania at the same price as imported petroleum.

OMV Petrom Bucharest International Half Marathon 
The second edition of OMV Petrom Bucharest International Half Marathon (2013) was organized by Bucharest Running Club Association in cooperation with the Romanian Athletic Federation and Bucharest City Hall. Petrom supported the second edition of the half marathon as leading sponsor.

Over 6.000 people from 43 countries have run at this edition of the event.

Half Marathon Winners 

The second edition of OMV Petrom Bucharest International Half Marathon took place on 19 May in Constitution Square, Bucharest. The competition included 4 competitive races: half marathon (21.097 km), team relay (4 x 5.3 km) individual race (10.5 km), popular race (3.5 km) and one uncompetitive race, kids’ race (4-12 y.o.).

Rankings and awards  
 1st in “The most valuable company in Romania” lists made by “Ziarul Financiar” in 2005-2011
 Trophy for “Excellence in Investments in Southeastern Europe” awarded by the Chamber of Commerce and Industry of Romania in 2005
 1st in the “Top Companies in Sector 1” list made by the Chamber of Commerce and Industry of Romania in 2008-2009
 1st in the “National Awards for companies in Romania” offered by the Chamber of Commerce and Industry of Romania in 2008-2009
 1st in the “Leading Company in Romania” list made by Finmedia in 2008, 2010, 2011
 1st in the “Non-financial companies and capitalization” list made by Finmedia in 2009
 1st in “The largest sponsor and the corporation with the largest impact in the history of Habitat for Humanity Romania and Europe” list made by Habitat for Humanity in 2009
 1st in “The largest company in Southeastern Europe” made by SeeNews in 2010-2011
 Safety Award - Sustainable Impact on Business for the project "Improvement of Safety Culture" offered by Dupont în 2010
 1st as the “Best CSR program - Andrei's School” in 2010
 1st in “The largest oil company in Romania” list made by “Ziarul Financiar” in 2012
 1st in the “Top 100 Companies” list made by Finmedia in 2012
 1st in “The (emitent) with the largest capitalization B.V.B.” list made by BVB in 2012
 1st in the “Best CSR strategy” list made by the Association for Community relations and AmCham, during the People for People Gala in 2012
 Won the auction for a perimeter of exploitation gas and crude oil from the Black Sea, in Georgia's offshore area.

References

External links

 Official Site 
 Official Site 
Annual Report 2008
 Respect for the future – results 2009
Petrom on Facebook
Petrom on Twitter
Petrom on Youtube
Petrom Press Office on Youtube
Petrom on Flickr

Oil and gas companies of Romania
Companies based in Bucharest
Privatization controversies
Privatized companies in Romania
Romanian brands
Companies listed on the Bucharest Stock Exchange